The 2019 Dalian Yifang F.C. season was the 10th season in club history.

Overview

Preseason 
Yifang started the winter training on 24 December 2018 in Dalian until 1 January 2019. The team moved to Kunming on 2 January for a 10-day training, before flying to Marbella, Spain for another 3-week training.

The club decided to end the contract with Bernd Schuster on 3 January. The team was close to Leonardo Jardim and he eventually refused the contract due to multiple concerns. Yifang reached agreement with Korean manager Choi Kang-hee, and officially announced it on 11 February. He was previously signed by Tianjin Quanjian (now renamed Tianjin Tianhai) by the end of the 2018 season, and Quanjian claimed his salary was beyond their ability since the owner and major investor of Quanjian was arrested for illegal MLM, thus terminated the contract. The team moved to Shanghai on 7 February for final preparations before the new season.

Yifang announced the joining of 5 players on 13 February. Wanda Group had had a long negotiation with S.S.C. Napoli on Marek Hamšík, and finally reached agreement on 14 February for a reported €15M transfer fee. Gaitán decided to leave for MSL club Chicago Fire since the team preferred a winger/striker with more offensive playing style than another midfielder upon the signing of Marek Hamšík. Zheng Long joined on a one-year loan, while Alex Akande was signed as soon as Yanbian FC claimed their bankruptcy by the end of the transfer window.

Wang Xianjun was absent from the list. As later reported, the talented defender did not sign contract and demanded transfer. Yifang eventually decided to put him back to the reserve squad.

March 
The first match in the 2019 season was a mere draw against Henan Jianye, as Yang Shanping was sent off in just 37 minutes, and Carrasco claimed the team's first goal this season, as he did last year, to save the team in additional times. Qin Sheng committed a foul and accidentally fell on Henan player Henrique Dourado, to broke Dourado's right tibia. All new players except Zheng Long had their debut match. Yifang had another draw with Guangzhou R&F. Carrasco extended his scoring sheet with a penalty and a reflection shot, while Zheng Long scored his first goal 1 minutes after he was substituted in.

First home match was a one-goal defeat. Hamšík met with former teammate Paolo Cannavaro, who currently sided with his brother Fabio as Guangzhou's coaching staff.

April 
Yifang started April with another defeat. Mushekwi's equalizer could not bring a victory, as the goalkeeper bumped into Zhao Mingjian's back clumsily, giving Johnathan a wide open goal. Hamšík's playing style was surrounded by controversy. He lacked dribbling and sprinting, which led to easy interceptions, and his long passes lost accuracy in this match. He was frequently compared to Nico Gaitán, whose impressive dribbling tricks made many contributions on both ends.

Yifang claimed the first victory on 15 April by overcoming great difficulties in Shandong. Mushekwi won a header. To fulfill the U23 policy, Yang Fangzhi came on at 90 minute, and went back to the bench in just 1 minute for He Yupeng. Li Shuai was sent off as he pushed opponent player in the face during a conflict. Yifang addressed him with a ¥500k fine, and sent him to the reserve team. He received an additional 6-match suspension.

Carrasco scored another reflection shot against Chongqing, but the home win slipped away as Zhao Mingjian committed a handball for a penalty. For the April 28 match with Beijing Guoan, Hamšík and Carrasco were both unfit for the game. Yifang's conservative 5-defender formation was unable to hold against the opponent, while Boateng had his first goal in a corner kick.

Noticeably, on 29 April, Wanda Group chairman Wang Jianlin officially announced the takeover of Dalian Yifang during the groundbreaking ceremony of Dalian Youth Football Training Base, a joint youth training program between Wanda Group and the government of Dalian, that the team would use neutral team name (without sponsors or owner names) in the future, as the CFA had requested.

May 
Yifang saw the first home win in the FA cup against Shaanxi, with Zhu Ting scoring the only goal in his 100th appearance for the team, to advance into the 5th round. They would face Shanghai Jiading Chengfa, the only amateur team left in the cup. 

Yifang gladly took 1 points away from Jiangsu Suning. Yu Ziqian entered the starting lineup as Zhang Chong had waist injury. Since his last appearance for Dalian Aerbin against Liaoning Whowin in the 2012 season, he had been absence in the Super League for 7 seasons. He was excluded from the first team at the time because of his frequent confusing blunders. 

In the 11 May match, the team lost to contestant Wuhan Zall, sliding deeper into the relegation area. Shan Pengfei had a large wound on his left eyebrow when going up for a header. He received on-pitch suture with staples, and finished the 1st half. 

On 19 May, Yifang overpowered Shenzhen and former manager Juan Caro. Li Jianbin was sent off at the end of 1st half. Hamšík was kicked in the face by Wang Dalong to earn a penalty, to give Carrasco his 7th goal. He Yupeng surprisingly scored Mushekwi's cross as soon as he came on the pitch at 90 minute, then immediately went off for Yang Fangzhi.

Noticeably, the club changed its registration name to "Dalian Professional Football Club" (Chinese: 大连人职业足球俱乐部) on 23 May, and the team name would be changed in the 2020 season.

A 1–0 home victory finally came on 26 May. Carrasco's corner found Hamšík for his first goal in China. He Yupeng missed a scoring chance similar to the previous game in the last few minutes. Zhao Xuebin scored twice to push Yifang further in the FA Cup. Yang Lei had his first appearance in the first team.

June 
June started with another defeat, with Carrasco absence for 4 yellow cards. Li Jianbin's easy marking and a misjudged interception gave 2 goals away. Mushekwi scored Hamšík's corner in the 2nd half. 

Carrasco did not return to the match against Hebei CFFC due to flight delay, and Yifang lost by 1 goal. Mushekwi received a red card for pushing Zhang Chengdong in the face, and he missed several matches for the 2019 AFCON cup as planned. Huang Jiahui had his debut match.

On 18 June, Rafael Benítez was connected with Yifang with a £12m salary offered.

On 23 June, Yifang drew with Tianjin Tianhai. Hamšík was selected captain. Boateng scored two goals for Yifang including a penalty, and later conceded an own goal. Li Shuai returned from suspension.

After three  rounds without victory, Yifang defeated Beijing Renhe on 29 June. Carrasco returned to the squad and scored a penalty. Hamšík showed controlling performance since last match, and forced Chen Jie to score an own goal. Boateng scored a gift goal from Zhang Lie. He and Zheng Long both scored off-side goals later.  

As the league reached halfway, Yifang ranked 10th (4 wins 5 draws 6 losses, GA:GF 19:22) at 17 points, much better than 2018 season (15th, 2W 4D 9L, 12:31, 10 points). Moreover, until the 15th round in the previous season, Yifang won only one point from away matches. In this season, on the contrary, they acquired 12 away points out of the total 15.

Carrasco issue
In the preseason training, Carrasco wanted a proof to transfer back to Europe in winter transfer after the 2019 season, while the team showed negotiable attitude. He publicly announced to stay with the team in the 2019 season.

He was put on the bench during the match against Beijing Guoan on 28 April due to a claimed influenza. As reported, he expressed reluctance to play as substitute, and contradicted the manager before the match. He made apologies consequently.

Until the end of May, Carrasco was the top goal scorer in quad, claiming 7 goals out of the total 13. He missed the match against Shanghai SIPG due to 4 yellow cards, and flew back to Europe for the June FIFA calendar ahead of time. During the FIFA calendar, Carrasco changed his attitude, showing strong desire to go back to Europe in the summer transfer window, and had transfer rumors with Arsenal. He returned to the team after the following match against Hebei CFFC due to a claimed flight delay. 

On 20 June, the whole issue outbroke, as goalkeeper Yu Ziqian publicly criticized on his social media that Carrasco went on a strike during the training session, that he "stood still regardless of anyone", and that he "skipped the previous two matches on purpose". The team decided to suspend Carrasco from matches and training, unless he publicly apologize for the behaviour. No further actions including apologies were taken until the 23 June match, but Carrasco showed dissatisfaction on his social media account. Yifang withdrew the suspension on 25 June, indicating a temporary pause of this issue. 

The entire issue seemed to have come to an end since Benítez's arrival, as Carrasco showed quite different competing desire, that "It's the first time I've had a good coach since I was in China".

July 
Yifang made major changes in managerial staff. On 1 July, Yifang announced the resignation of Choi Kang-hee. This also extended an awkward record, that no Korean manager could finish a complete season with teams in Dalian (Park Sung-hwa with Dalian Shide, June 2010 to May 2011; Chang Woe-ryong with Dalian Aerbin, Jan–Apr 2012). One day later, Rafael Benítez was officially appointed as the manager. He said the career in China would be a challenge, and he was impressed by chairman Wang's passion and future plan on football, and made the decision after consulting Juan Caro and Gregorio Manzano. He also restarted his personal blog after a 5-year-hiatus.

On 3 July, Zhou Jun quit his job as the club director, and returned to Shanghai Shenhua. Gao Yan from Wanda Group was selected for the position.

Benítez had his debut win against Henan Jianye. Boateng scored twice again. He and Carrasco continued to extend their scoring sheet to win 3 points from Guangzhou R&F. Zhou Ting had his 400th top-tier league appearance in the match against Guangzhou Evergrande. 

Yifang announced the departure of Mushekwi on 15 July. Local fans gathered at the airport to say goodbye. 4 days later, Salomón Rondón officially signed with the ream.

Carrasco scored a corner directly against Tianjin TEDA. Rondón scored on his first possession, disallowed as offside by VAR. He claimed his debut goal later, to bring one point for the team. Boateng claimed his hat-trick in the FA Cup against Tianjin Tianhai.

As the CSL summer window reached its closing date, Shan Huanhuan and 3 other young players under the Wanda "Star of Hope" project were confirmed to join the squad.

August
Boateng pulled his muscle, and Rondón's decisive substitution performance won a 3-pointer from Chongqing under hot climate. Sun Bo won a long shot and a red card upon his first starting appearance.

The quick reunion with former coach Choi Kang-hee was not pleasant, as he overpowered his former team by two easy counter-attack goals from El Shaarawy. Yifang still could not breakthrough their highest record in the FA cup, reaching semi-finals in 2013, 2018 and 2019.

September 
The league would meet a few long pauses to prepare for the 2022 World Cup qualification, and the team's condition was influenced by the extra-long break. Yifang struggled in Wuhan's high humidity and temperature with insufficient fitness, and lost by 1 goal. Li Jianbin earned his second red card for kicking the ball deliberately onto the opponent after the whistle. He would be grounded for 6 matches in total, to miss the rest matches in this season.

Dong Yanfeng claimed his first super league goal against Shenzhen.

October 
Li Shuai had his first national team appearance against Guam on 10 October.

On 25 October, it was announced that Dalian Yifang Women's Football Club (Dalian Yifang W.F.C., official name currently vacant), based on Dalian Under-18 women's football team, was established to meet the CFA's entry standard in 2020, and would compete in the 2019 Chinese Women's League Two, the third-tier league. Fan Yiying stepped up as the manager. On 10 November 2019, Yifang W.F.C. won by 1–0 against Donghua University in the play-off, ranked by 5th, and gained promotion into the Chinese Women's Football League.

November 
Zhou Ting broke the record of the oldest appearing player at 40 years and 291 days against Hebei CFFC, which had previous been held by Rolando Schiavi (40 years 285 days) since 2013.

December 
Zhao Xuebin won the reserve league top goalscorer by 19 goals.

Summary 
Throughout the 2019 season, Yifang won three more points than last year, and ensured safety from relegation much earlier. The team had overall equalized performance in home and away matches, band ut with Choi, Yifang acquired three away wins out the total of four at the time. 

Choi Kang-hee made multiple adjustments at the beginning of the season, mainly the midfielders. He often used Carrasco as a roaming attacker, not restrained to his familiar left winger position, and spent quite some time to adjust Hamšík's role. 

Benítez was aggressive at first, and he soon brought in his 5-4-1 formation, aiming to improve the defense. He moved Sun Guowen backwards as the right full back, who mostly played as a winger, and put the right back Dong Yanfeng in the CB position. With each coach, the team received four red cards respectively, being the team with the most red cards this season, as major defenders were slower at sprinting speed, and sometimes used rude fouls to stop opponent players.

Squad

First team squad

Left during the season

Reserve squad

Out on loan

Coaching staff

Transfers

Winter

In

Out

Summer

In

Out

Friendlies

Preseason

Chinese Super League

League table

Results summary

Position by round

League fixtures and results 
Fixtures as of February 2019.

Chinese FA Cup

Squad statistics

Appearances and goals

Goalscorers

Disciplinary record

Suspensions

References 

Dalian Professional F.C. seasons
Dalian Yifang F.C.